Ishbak ( Yīšbāq, "he will leave; leaving"), also spelled Jisbak and Josabak, was, according to the Bible, the fifth son of Abraham and Keturah.  Ishbak had five brothers, Zimran, Jokshan, Medan, Midian and Shuah.

Josephus tells us that "Abraham contrived to settle them in colonies; and they took possession of Troglodytis and the country of Arabia the Happy, as far as it reaches to the Red Sea." Little else is known about him, but his descendants may be the people identified in a cuneiform inscription to a people known as Jasbuqu.

References

a

External links
Easton's Bible Dictionary: Ishbak

Children of Abraham